Events in the year 1798 in the Belgian Departments of France. The French First Republic had annexed the Austrian Netherlands and Prince-bishopric of Liège (predecessor states of modern Belgium) in 1795 and had reorganised the territory as the nine departments Dyle, Escaut (department), Forêts, Jemmape, Lys, Meuse-Inférieure, Deux-Nèthes, Ourthe, and Sambre-et-Meuse.

The year 1798 corresponds to the period from 12 Nivôse of Year VI to 11 Nivôse of Year VII in the French Republican Calendar.

Incumbents

Directors – Paul Barras, Louis Marie de La Révellière-Lépeaux, Jean-François Rewbell, Philippe-Antoine Merlin de Douai, François de Neufchâteau (until 20 May), Jean Baptiste Treilhard (from 20 May)

Events
Over the course of the year Lieven Bauwens made numerous trips to England, smuggling out spinning machinery a piece at a time.

September
 5 September – French legislature passes Law of 19 Fructidor, Year VI instituting universal conscription of all unmarried men aged 20 to 25.

October
 12 October – beginning of the Peasants' War (Boerenkrijg) in Flanders and Brabant.
 22 October – short-lived liberation of Mechelen from French rule.
 24 October – attempted British landing at Blankenberge fails.

December
 5 December – Decisive defeat of Peasant Army near Hasselt.

Deaths
 24 June – Maria Christina, Duchess of Teschen (born 1742), former governess general of the Austrian Netherlands
 21 August – Cornelius Franciscus Nelis (born 1736), bishop of Antwerp.

References

Former departments of France in Belgium